Jane Moore (born 17 May 1962) is an English journalist, author and television presenter, best known as a columnist for The Sun newspaper and as a panellist and anchor on the ITV lunchtime chat show Loose Women between 1999 and 2002, returning as a regular panellist in 2013. Since 2018, Moore has been regularly relief-anchoring the show.

Early life

Moore was born in Oxford. Her father was a professor of mathematics at the University of Oxford, and her mother was a teacher. She went to primary school in Oxford, then went to the Worcester Grammar School for Girls on Spetchley Road in Worcester, when her parents divorced. Since the divorce, she has not heard from her father. At school, Moore always wanted to be a journalist, but was told by her teachers that 'it was no job for a lady'. She studied journalism at the South Glamorgan Institute of Higher Education in Cardiff, then trained at the Solihull News in 1981, moving to work full-time at the Birmingham Mail and the Birmingham Post.

Career
Moore is a columnist for The Sun and writes regular articles for The Sunday Times. She has also written for Hello. In 2006, she was nominated for a British Press Award in the category of 'Columnist of the Year', but lost out to Lucy Kellaway.

She also revealed in October 2021 on Loose Women that she was briefly an estate agent.

Television
On 19 April 2002, Moore guest-presented This Morning.

Moore moved to the BBC and regularly contributed on Question Time (2002–2012), The Andrew Marr Show (2005–21), This Week (2003–2015) and BBC Breakfast.

Moore guest presented The Wright Stuff in 2003 and 2004, and was a panellist in 2008. On 4 February 2011, she guest hosted The Wright Stuff.

From 2006 to 2007, Moore was a team captain on the BBC Three programme Rob Brydon's Annually Retentive, a comedy take on celebrity panel shows.

On 25 July 2011, she presented the six-part BBC Two series Wonderstuff.

Moore has also done some work with the  Channel 4 programme Dispatches and has presented a number of online videos for the broadcaster.

Moore was a panellist on the ITV chat show Loose Women between 1999 and 2002. She returned to the programme on 15 October 2013.

Books
Fourplay (2001)
The Ex Files (2003)
dot.homme (2004)
The Second Wives Club (2005)
Love @ First Site (2005)

Other work

She started the consumer website Youthejury.com in 2006; however, the site is defunct.

Personal life
Moore married Gary Farrow, the former vice-president of communications at Sony Music Entertainment, in 2002. Elton John was the best man at their wedding. Her husband owns a PR agency called The Corporation Group. They live in Richmond with their daughters Ellie, Grace and Lauren, and their Tibetan terrier dog named Jasper.

On 7 December 2022, while on-air on Loose Women, Moore revealed she and her husband were to separate.

Filmography

Guest appearances
Have I Got News for You (4 May 2001) 
The Weakest Link: Presenters Special (24 December 2001)
Never Mind the Buzzcocks (12 January 2004) 
The Apprentice: You're Fired! (26 April 2006, 2 May 2007, 14 May 2008, 3 June 2009)
The Sharon Osbourne Show (16 October 2006) 
News 24 Sunday (5 August 2007) 
Countdown (26–30 October 2009) 
Genius (4 October 2010)
Pointless Celebrities (5 November 2016) 
After the News (24 October 2017)
The Chase: Celebrity Special (2017/2018)

References

External links 

1962 births
English journalists
English television presenters
Living people
People from Oxford